Santower See is a lake in the Nordwestmecklenburg district in Mecklenburg-Vorpommern, Germany. At an elevation of 36 m, its surface area is 1.03 km².

Lakes of Mecklenburg-Western Pomerania
Nature reserves in Mecklenburg-Western Pomerania